Chokan may refer to:

Chōkan, an era in Japanese history
Chokan Valikhanov (1835–1865), first Kazakh scholar, ethnographer and historian